In software engineering, active reviews for intermediate designs (ARID) is a method to evaluate software architectures, especially on an intermediate level, i.e. for non-finished architectures. It combines aspects from scenario-based design review techniques, such as the architecture tradeoff analysis method (ATAM) and the software architecture analysis method (SAAM), as well as active design reviews (ADR).

See also 
Architectural analytics

References

External links
 Active Reviews for Intermediate Designs

Software architecture
Enterprise architecture